An economic expansion is an increase in the level of economic activity, and of the goods and services available.  It is a period of economic growth as measured by a rise in real GDP. The explanation of fluctuations in aggregate economic activity between economic expansions and contractions is one of the primary concerns of macroeconomics.

Typically an economic expansion is marked by an upturn in production and utilization of resources. Economic recovery and prosperity are two successive  phases of expansion, where as a recession is defined as two declining periods of GDP. Expansion may be caused by factors external to the economy, such as weather conditions or technical change, or by factors internal to the economy, such as fiscal policies, monetary policies, the availability of credit, interest rates, regulatory policies or other impacts on producer incentives. Global conditions may influence the levels of economic activity in various countries.

Economic contraction and expansion relate to the overall output of all goods and services, while the terms inflation and deflation refer to increasing and decreasing prices of commodities, goods and services in relation to the value of money.

Expansion means enlarging the scale of a company. The ways of expansion include internal expansion and integration.
Internal expansion means a company enlarges its scale through opening branches, inventing new products, or developing new businesses. Integration means a company enlarges its scale through taking over or merging with other companies.

References

External links
  "Business Cycle Expansions and Contractions", National Bureau of Economic Research

Business cycle
Expansion
Market trends